Rocky River is a  long 5th order tributary to the Deep River in Chatham County, North Carolina.

Course
Rocky River rises in Liberty, North Carolina on the Sandy Creek and North Prong divide in Randolph County and then flows southeasterly to the Deep River about 3 miles west of Moncure, North Carolina.

Watershed
Rocky River drains  of area, receives about 47.6 in/year of precipitation, and has a wetness index of 426.50 and is about 55% forested.

See also
List of rivers of North Carolina

External links
White Pines Nature Preserve
USGS Water Gauge at Siler City
USGS Water Gauge near Crutchfield Crossroads, North Carolina
Rocky River Nature Trail in Siler City

References

Rivers of North Carolina
Rivers of Chatham County, North Carolina
Rivers of Randolph County, North Carolina